Elsterheide, in Sorbian Halštrowska hola, is a municipality in the district of Bautzen, in Saxony, Germany.

The municipality is part of the recognized Sorbian settlement area in Saxony. Upper Sorbian has an official status next to German.

History
The municipality of Elsterheide was formed in 1995 by merging the former municipalities of Neuwiese, Sabrodt, Nardt, Klein Partwitz, Seidewinkel, Tätzschwitz, Bluno and Geierswalde. Within Prussian Silesia (Province of Silesia 1815–1919 and 1938–41, Province of Lower Silesia 1919–38 and 1941–45), all of these municipalities were part of Landkreis Hoyerswerda. Within the East German Bezirk Cottbus, they were part of Kreis Hoyerswerda. With German unification in 1990, they became part of Saxony.

References 

Populated places in Bautzen (district)